Arif Al Haydar (born 20 June 1997) is a Saudi Arabian professional footballer who plays as a right winger or a right back for Saudi Professional League side Al-Adalah.

Career
On 1 August 2018, Al Haydar joined Najran. He spent 2 seasons at the club and made 44 league appearances and scored 9 goals. On 3 October 2020, Al Haydar joined Damac on a three-year deal. On 24 July 2022, Al Haydar joined newly promoted Pro League side Al-Adalah on a free transfer following his release from Damac.

References

External links
 

1997 births
Living people
People from Najran
Saudi Arabian footballers
Association football midfielders
Najran SC players
Damac FC players
Al-Adalah FC players
Saudi First Division League players
Saudi Professional League players